La Salina is a town and municipality in the Department of Casanare, Colombia.

Municipalities of Casanare Department